Fitz Manor is a manor house in the village of Fitz near Montford Bridge, Shropshire, England. It is a Grade II* listed building.

The manor, which overlooks the  River Severn,  was built in 1450, although the original structure is believed to have been a Saxon Hall. The manor was owned at one time by the bishop of Shrewsbury and it had its own church. In the 20th century it came into the ownership of the Baly family.

See also
Grade II* listed buildings in Shropshire Council (A–G)
Listed buildings in Pimhill

References

External links
Official site

Manor houses in England
Buildings and structures in Shropshire
Hotels in Shropshire
Buildings and structures completed in 1450
Grade II* listed buildings in Shropshire
Country house hotels